Enolmis gigantella is a moth of the family Scythrididae. It was described by Daniel Lucas in 1942. It is found in Morocco.

References

Scythrididae
Moths described in 1942